The 1st IAAF World Indoor Championships in Athletics were held in Indianapolis, United States from March 6 to March 8, 1987. The championship had previously been known as the World Indoor Games, which were held once before changing the name.

Being the second championship of its kind, there were several championship records. New championship records were set for every single women's event. There were a total number of 419 participating athletes from 85 countries.

Results

Men

1 Ben Johnson of Canada originally won the 60 metres in 6.41, but was disqualified in September 1989 after admitting to using steroids between 1981 and 1988.

Women

1 Angella Issajenko of Canada originally finished second in the 60 metres in 7.08, but was disqualified in September 1989 after admitting to steroid use between 1985 and 1988.

Medal table

Participating nations

 (1)
 (3)
 (2)
 (1)
 (9)
 (4)
 (2)
 (1)
 (2)
 (4)
 (2)
 (1)
 (1)
 (3)
 (12)
 (1)
 (1)
 (15)
 (1)
 (3)
 (8)
 (2)
 (1)
 (7)
 (2)
 (7)
 (2)
 (2)
 (10)
 (2)
 (4)
 (3)
 (12)
 (1)
 (17)
 (3)
 (4)
 (6)
 (2)
 (1)
 (4)
 (15)
 (1)
 (8)
 (5)
 (10)
 (1)
 (2)
 (1)
 (2)
 (1)
 (6)
 (2)
 (9)
 (2)
 (1)
 (11)
 (4)
 (1)
 (1)
 (2)
 (1)
 (6)
 (10)
 (3)
 (1)
 (2)
 (1)
 (2)
 (1)
 (1)
 (24)
 (12)
 (1)
 (5)
 (7)
 (1)
 (1)
 (2)
 (2)
 (42)
 (3)
 (14)
 (3)
 (2)

See also
 1987 in athletics (track and field)

References

External links
GBR Athletics
Athletics Australia

 
World Indoor Championships
IAAF World Indoor Championships
World Athletics Indoor Championships
International track and field competitions hosted by the United States
Sports competitions in Indianapolis
March 1987 sports events in the United States
1987 in sports in Indiana
1980s in Indianapolis
Track and field in Indiana